Wuttke is a German locational surname, which originally meant a person from Wutike, near Neuruppin, Germany. The name may refer to:

Adolf Wuttke (1819–1870), German theologian
Dietmar Wuttke (born 1978), German football player
Heinrich Wuttke (1818–1876), German historian
Jörg Elling Wuttke (born 1970), German musician
Martin Wuttke (born 1962), German actor
Tim Wuttke (born 1987), German football player
Wolfram Wuttke (1961–2015), German football player

Fiction
Peter Wuttke, fictional character in the German television series Die Wochenshow

References

German-language surnames